Emma van Bussel (born 2 May 1989) is an Australian team handball player. She plays for the Sydney University HC, and on the Australian national team. She represented Australia at the 2013 World Women's Handball Championship in Serbia.

Emma juggles her representative handball commitments with a career as an external auditor at Ernst & Young.

Indoor handball career 
She was part of the New South Wales state team for the Australian championships and contributed to the team earning gold medals in 2005, 2006 and 2008.

Beach handball career 
She was part of one of New South Wales team that won the Australian Championship silver medal in 2010 and 2015 and gold  in 2011, 2014 and 2016.

International indoor handball career 
She was selected and represented Australia at the 

2008 Junior World Championships in Macedonia

2013 World Women's Handball Championship in Serbia

2017 Busan International Friendly Tournament

2018 Busan International Friendly Tournament

International beach handball career 
She represented Australia for the following events:
 2012 Beach Handball world championships - Oman
 2014 Beach Handball World Championships - Brazil

References

Australian female handball players
1989 births
Living people